Dhunat Upazila is an upazila of Bogra District in the Division of Rajshahi, Bangladesh.
Dhunat Thana was established in 1962 and was converted into an upazila in 1983. It is named after its administrative center, the town of Dhunat, which

Geography
It lies on the west bank of the Jamuna River. It borders Gabtali and Sariakandi upazilas to the north, Sirajganj District to the east and south, and Sherpur and Shajahanpur upazilas to the west.

Demographics

According to the 2011 Bangladesh census, Dhunat Upazila had 75,897 households and a population of 555,014, 7.8% of whom lived in urban areas. 10.3% of the population was under the age of 5. The literacy rate (age 7 and over) was 35.6%, compared to the national average of 51.8%.

Administration
Dhunat Upazila is divided into Dhunat Municipality and 10 union parishads: Kalerpara, Bhandarbari, Chaukibari, Chikashi, Dhunat, Elangi, Gopalnagar, Gosainbari, Mathurapur, and Nimgachhi. The union parishads are subdivided into 90 mauzas and 207 villages.

Chairman :Md. Abdul Hi Khokon

Vice Chairman :Md.Mohosin Alom

Women Vice Chairman :Popi Rani Saha

Upazila Nirbahi Officer (UNO): Rajia Sultana

Dhunat Municipality is subdivided into 9 wards and 16 mahallas.

Education

There are 10 colleges in the upazila. They include Dhunat Mohila College, founded in 1996, Jalsuka Habibur Rahman Degree College, G.M.C Degree College, Goshai Bari Degree College, and Sonahata College. Dhunat Degree College, founded in 1972, is the only honors level college in the upazila.

According to Banglapedia, Panchthupi Nasratpur Jaher Ali High School,  Dhunat High School, founded in 1941, is a notable secondary school and another Dhunat Adarsh High School, founded in 1988.  

The madrasa education system includes three fazil madrasas. According to Banglapedia, Jorkhali Senior Madrasa, founded in 1911, is a notable one.

See also
Upazilas of Bangladesh
Districts of Bangladesh
Divisions of Bangladesh

References
<references>

<ref chapter=Dhunat Upazila |chapter-url=https://www.facebook.com/Dhunatupazila</ref>
</references>

Upazilas of Bogra District